Dombarovsky District is an administrative and municipal district (raion), one of the thirty-five in Orenburg Oblast, Russia. It is located in the southeast of the oblast. Its administrative center is the rural locality (a settlement) of Dombarovsky. Population: 15,994 (2010 Census);  The population of the administrative center accounts for 53.9% of the total district's population.

References

Notes

Sources

Districts of Orenburg Oblast